Sindila Hydroelectric Power Station, also Sindila Power Station, is an operational  mini-hydropower station in the Western Region of Uganda.

Location
The power station is located across the Sindila River, just outside Rwenzori National Park, in Bundibugyo District, in Uganda's Western Region. This location is in close proximity of the  Ndugutu Hydroelectric Power Station, which is owned by the same developer.

Overview
Sindila HEPS is a run-of-river mini-hydro power plant whose planned maximum installed capacity is 5.9MW. The project is owned by a consortium of investors as depicted in the ownership table below. The consortium that owns and is developing Sindila Power Station, also owns the nearby Ndugutu Hydroelectric Power Station.

Ownership
The special company vehicle known as Sindila Power Company Uganda Limited, is owned by the following corporate entities:

Timeline
Sindila Power Station received approval for GetFit support in October 2014. Financial close was reached on 30 January 2017. Construction started in February 2017 and was completed in October 2019.

Funding
Construction is expected to cost US$17 million, with US$3.3 million in GetFit subsidies. Funding for reinforcement of the 33kV high-voltage evacuation line, that measures  is included in the GetFit package. The power generated, together with that from the nearby Ndugutu Power Station, will be evacuated to Fort Portal and sold to Uganda Electricity Transmission Company Limited, under a renewable twenty-year power sales agreement.

See also
 Buranga Geothermal Power Station
 List of power stations in Uganda

References

External links
  Sindila Hydropower Project
 Breaking new ground with Sindila hydropower As of February 2017 
  Overview of Uganda's Energy Sector In 2012
 Uganda – energy, oil and gas are key areas of investment As of 5 July 2016.

Hydroelectric power stations in Uganda
Bundibugyo District